Hernán Fuentes (26 February 1918 – 7 January 1999) was a Chilean modern pentathlete. He competed at the 1948 and 1952 Summer Olympics.

References

External links
 

1918 births
1999 deaths
Chilean male modern pentathletes
Olympic modern pentathletes of Chile
Modern pentathletes at the 1948 Summer Olympics
Modern pentathletes at the 1952 Summer Olympics
Pan American Games bronze medalists for Chile
Pan American Games medalists in modern pentathlon
Modern pentathletes at the 1955 Pan American Games
Medalists at the 1955 Pan American Games
20th-century Chilean people